Dindigul Dragons is a Twenty20 cricket team representing the city of Dindigul in the Tamil Nadu Premier League (TNPL).

The team is owned by Srinivasan H R, vice chairman and managing director of Take Solutions.
The team is coached by former Indian cricketer S. Badrinath. Hari Nishaanth is the captain of the franchise.

Franchise history
Srinivasan H R, vice chairman and managing director of Take Solutions, was the 7th highest bidder. He chose the district Dindigul and the team was named as Dindigul Dragons. The team's launch took place on 22 August 2016 at the NPR College Ground in Natham, Dindigul.

Current squad

2021

 Srinivasan 
 K Vishal Vaidhya
 S Arun
 Advaith Sharma
 R Suthesh
 S Swaminathan
 L Vignesh
 RS Mokit Hariharan
 S Lokeshwar
 C Hari Nishaanth
 C Ashwin
 MS Sanjay
 V Lakshman
 K Mani Bharathy
 AR Siva Murugan
 Gurjapneet Singh
 R Vimal Khumar
 Kishan Kumar S
 Vigneshwaran S
 Ravichandran Ashwin(C) 
 R Vivek
 M Silambarasan

Support Staff

Head Coach: M. Venkataramana

Achievements

 N Jagadeesan was the tournament's leading run scorer with 397 runs and was also named as the Player of the Tournament.

Jagadeesan became the first batsman to score 1000 runs in TNPL when he scored 87* against Madurai Panthers on 22 July 2017 at ICL Cricket Ground, Tirunelveli.

See also 
 Indian Premier League
 Karnataka Premier League
 Rajputana Premier League

References

External links 

Tamil Nadu Premier League
Sport in Tamil Nadu
Cricket teams in India
Cricket in Tamil Nadu